Secrets of a Co-Ed is a 1942 American crime film directed by Joseph H. Lewis and written by George Wallace Sayre. The film stars Otto Kruger, Tina Thayer, Rick Vallin, Russell Hoyt, Marcia Mae Jones and Geraldine Spreckels. The film was released on October 26, 1942, by Producers Releasing Corporation.

Plot

Cast          
Otto Kruger as James Reynolds
Tina Thayer as Brenda Reynolds
Rick Vallin as Nick Jordan
Russell Hoyt as Bill
Marcia Mae Jones as Laura Wright
Geraldine Spreckels as Tessie Smith
Diana Del Rio as Maria
Herb Vigran as Soapy
Patricia Knox as Flo
Claire Rochelle as Miss Wilson
Addison Richards as District Attorney
Isabelle LaMal as College Dean Sophie

References

External links
 

1942 films
1940s English-language films
American crime films
1942 crime films
Producers Releasing Corporation films
Films directed by Joseph H. Lewis
Films set in universities and colleges
American black-and-white films
1940s American films